Rushema Begum (1933/1934 – 9 July 2019) was a Bangladeshi teacher and politician who was elected as Member of 11th Jatiya Sangsad of Reserved Seats for Women. She was a politician of Bangladesh Awami League.

Career
Begum had started her career as a teacher of Ishan Memorial High School of Faridpur District. Later, she had become the Headmistress of the institution too. Her husband Imamuddin Ahmad was elected as an MP in First General Election of Bangladesh from Faridpur-5 (now Faridpur-3). He was connected to the politics of Bangladesh Awami League.

Begum was elected as a Member of 11th Jatiya Sangsad of Reserved Seats for Women on 16 February 2019. She had died on 9 July 2019 in Faridpur Heart Foundation Hospital at the age of 85.

References

2019 deaths
1930s births
People from Faridpur District
Bangladeshi educators
Awami League politicians
11th Jatiya Sangsad members
Women members of the Jatiya Sangsad
Date of birth missing
21st-century Bangladeshi women politicians